Michael Derek Waterfield  (born 1941) is a British biochemist and cancer biologist.

Honours and awards
He was elected to the Royal Society in 1991, and awarded its Buchanan Medal in 2002 "for his exceptional skill in protein biochemistry which have  transformed our understanding of signal transduction, and the subversion of cellular signalling pathways in cancer".

References

Fellows of the Royal Society
Living people
1941 births